Tachys pumilus is a species of ground beetle in the family Carabidae. It is found in the Caribbean Sea, Central America, and North America.

References

Further reading

 

Trechinae
Articles created by Qbugbot
Beetles described in 1831
Beetles of Central America
Beetles of North America